Armstrong Studios, also known as Bill Armstrong's Studio and later renamed AAV (Armstrong Audio Video), is an Australian commercial recording studio located in  Melbourne, Victoria.  During the decade from 1965 to 1975, Armstrong Studios in South Melbourne was arguably the top independent recording studio in Australasia.

History

The founder
Founder Bill Armstrong was born in Melbourne in 1929. After studying electrical engineering at Caulfield Technical College he started his career as an engineer at radio station 3UZ from 1954–56, where his work included disc cutting of radio shows and live-to-air orchestral music broadcasts. From 1956-60 he was the manager of a recently founded independent label, W&G Records, whose A&R manager Ron Tudor discovered and signed The Seekers. Armstrong established the W&G disc-cutting room and in 1957 built their recording studio in West Melbourne. That year he also supervised the sound system for Phillips Bell at the Main Stadium at the 1956 Olympic Games in Melbourne.

From 1960-61 Armstrong was the manager of the Custom Recording Department at 3DB in Melbourne, where he recorded radio commercials and soundtracks for television advertisements. From 1961-65 he was manager of Telefil Sound Recording and Film Studios, which was at the time the largest commercial recording studio in Melbourne. Housed in a converted Melbourne cinema, it was equipped with one, two and three track Ampex recorders, and its clients included the local divisions of the EMI, CBS and RCA labels.

Opening a studio
In 1965, Armstrong opened his own studio in a small terrace house in Albert Rd, South Melbourne. One of the first pop recordings made there was the backing track for The Easybeats' 1965 breakthrough hit "She's So Fine", which was overseen by British-born engineer Roger Savage, who had recently arrived from the UK as an assisted migrant. Reflecting on Savage's subsequent importance to the Australian music industry in a 2013 ABC radio interview, Bill Armstrong quipped that Savage's assisted passage to Australia represented "probably the best £20 the Australian government ever spent".

Over the next few years it expanded into six adjoining properties, including four studios equipped with 4-track machines. In 1968 Armstrong installed one of the first 8-track recorders in Australia, followed by 16 and then 24-track machines, together with state-of-the-art mixing desks in the early '70s. During this time, many of Australia's most distinguished producers and engineers worked there. The original engineering team were Roger Savage, Allan Pay and Philip Webster. In 1968 John L Sayers joined the team and later Alan Pay resigned. Then Graham Owens and Ernie Rose joined as engineers. The EMI producers David Mackay, Franciscus Henri, Howard Gable, Peter Dawkins and Ted Albert, all worked at Armstrong's. Other producers included Ron Tudor of Fable Records, Johnny Young of Lewis Young Productions, Pat Aulton, G. Wayne Thomas and Ian Meldrum.

Armstrong's studios soon overtook two other major studios in Australia at the time - the EMI and Festival Records facilities in Sydney - to become the most sought-after recording venue in the country, and the "engine room" of Australian pop and rock recording. Many of the most popular and successful Australian recordings from the mid-1960s to the mid-1980s were made there, including hit albums and singles by The Masters Apprentices, The Twilights, The Groove, The Groop, Zoot, The Aztecs, Russell Morris, Brian Cadd, Daddy Cool, Franciscus Henri, Hans Poulsen, Spectrum, John Farnham, Skyhooks, Little River Band, The Sports, Models and many others. Many famous overseas artists also recorded there while visiting Australia, including Earl Hines, Cleo Laine and John Dankworth, and Stephane Grapelli.

Armstrong's also quickly became the leading studio for recording national advertising commercials, and a team of music jingle writers occupied offices in the facility, including John and Anne Hawker, Peter Best, Bruce Smeaton, Bruce Woodley,  Peter Jones and John Farrar. According to Armstrong, industry professionals such as EMI house producer David Mackay and Festival house producer Pat Aulton greatly preferred to use the Armstrong facilities over their company's own studios in Sydney, and regularly travelled to Melbourne to record there. Interviewed in 2013, Armstrong also recalled that young Melbourne singer Johnny Farnham was often hired to record vocals for the many commercial jingles recorded at Armstrong's, and it was there that he was discovered by producer David Mackay, who subsequently signed the singer to a recording contract with EMI, and produced his breakthrough hit single "Sadie The Cleaning Lady". Farnham returned the favour many years later when he returned to Armstrong's to record his hugely successful 'comeback' album Whispering Jack.

Expansion
In 1972 the company bought a former butter factory in Bank St, South Melbourne, and converted it into a five-studio complex, making Armstrong the largest commercial studio in the southern hemisphere. At this time Armstrong was responsible for 80% of the locally recorded hit records for major labels including EMI, RCA, Mushroom and Fable. In 1974 the studios were sold to the Age Newspaper Group and the name of the company was changed to Armstrong Audio Video (AAV).

The studio's success continued into the 1980s. Young engineer Doug Brady joined the staff and started his career at AAV by recording and mixing Australia's highest selling record of all time: John Farnham's Whispering Jack, going on to win ARIA Engineer of the Year three times. James "JIMBO" Barton was also added to the roster. He went on to work with Julian Menndelson & Trevor Horn, multi-platinum Queensrÿche and won a Grammy Award for Best Live Recording for Eric Clapton's "Unplugged". Other renowned acts who recorded at AAV in this period include U2, Paul McCartney, Madonna, Bob Dylan, Split Enz, Crowded House and Australian Crawl.

Recent years
In the 1990s the audio operations of AAV were acquired by a staff consortium headed by producer-engineer Ern Rose and the company's name was changed to Metropolis Audio. A controlling share was later acquired by another audio-visual company, Celtex, but this company eventually got into financial difficulties and Metropolis was abruptly closed down by the building's owners in 2006.

In the meantime Edensound Mastering had taken residence in the famed 180 Bank Street building and directors Martin Pullan and David Drew took the opportunity to take over the lease and return the studio to its original Armstrong name. Doug Brady returned as a partner in the business having recorded numerous giant albums and recording projects as a freelance including the music for the Sydney Olympic Games in 2000. After a massive revamp including the installation of a vintage Neve console, Armstrong Studios today continues to be one of the foremost recording facilities in the southern hemisphere.

References

External links
 Official website

Australian music industry
Recording studios in Australia
1965 establishments in Australia
2006 disestablishments in Australia